The 1999 Cork Intermediate Hurling Championship was the 90th staging of the Cork Intermediate Hurling Championship since its establishment by the Cork County Board in 1909. The draw for the opening fixtures took place on 11 December 1998.  The championship began on 18 June 1999 and ended on 21 November 1999. It was the last championship to be played using a straight knock-out format.

On 21 November 1999, Ballincollig won the championship after a 1–14 to 2–09 defeat of Blarney in the final at Páirc Uí Chaoimh. It was their seventh championship title overall and their first title since 1967.

Ballincollig's Podsie O'Mahony was the championship's top score wit 3-24.

Team changes

From Championship

Promoted to the Cork Senior Hurling Championship
 Castlelyons

To Championship

Promoted from the Cork Junior A Hurling Championship
 Bride Rovers

Results

First round

Second round

Quarter-finals

Semi-finals

Final

Championship statistics

Top scorers

Overall

In a single game

References

Cork Intermediate Hurling Championship
Cork Intermediate Hurling Championship